Mount June is a mountain, elevation 1090 m,  west of Mount Paige in the Phillips Mountains of the Ford Ranges, in Marie Byrd Land, Antarctica. It was discovered by the Byrd Antarctic Expedition in December 1929, and named for Harold Irving June, an airplane pilot with the expedition.

Features 
 Adams Rocks - rocks 13 km east of the mountain.
 Lewis Rocks - 5 km southwest of Mount June.

References

Mountains of Marie Byrd Land